KM Plus Media is a Czech Republic based production house that wildlife documentaries, children titles, lifestyle and travel shows. The company was founded by Ladislav Švestka in 2009. It predominantly works in HD for all broadcast platforms worldwide. Since 2012, KM Plus Media started close co-operation with WildBear Entertainment Australia. In 2014, Times Internet's video-on-demand service 
Box TV signed a contract to add content from KM plus Media to its catalogue.

Production
2017, Inside the Criminal Mind
2018, Terrorism Close Calls
2018, Empire Games
2016-2019, Top 10 Secrets and Mysteries 
2016, Top 10 Architecture
2012, Miracles of Nature
2015, M.A.D. World
2012, Close Quarter Battle
2015, Super Senses 
2016, Desperate Hours
2015, Race of Life
2014, Wild Ones
2013, My Animal Friends	
2012, Unusual Cultures
2016, Animal Armory
2016, Survive the Wild
2015, My Animal Friends 3: Underwater Mission
2016, Wild Ones 3: World of the Wild
2016–2017, Hitler

References

External links
 IMDb.com

Film production companies of the Czech Republic
Television production companies of the Czech Republic